Nikola Kleut (20 February 1908 – 28 March 1946) was a Serbian athlete. He competed in the men's discus throw at the 1936 Summer Olympics, representing Yugoslavia.

References

External links
 

1908 births
1946 deaths
Athletes (track and field) at the 1936 Summer Olympics
Serbian male discus throwers
Yugoslav male discus throwers
Olympic athletes of Yugoslavia
Place of birth missing
Serbs of Croatia